The Karzełek (diminutive of karzeł – a small one, used for describing non-fantasy dwarfs) or Skarbnik, Kladenets (Russian: Скарбник, Кладенец) (the Treasurer) or Dzedka (Belarusian: Дзедка) in Slavic mythology live in mines and underground workings and are the guardians of gems, crystals, and precious metals. It is said that they will protect miners from danger and lead them back when they are lost. They will also lead them to veins of ore. To people who are evil or insult them they are deadly, pushing them into dark chasms or send tunnels crashing down upon them. Hurling rocks, whistling, or covering one's head are actions that are offensive to Skarbnik, who will warn the offender with handfuls of pelted soil in their direction before taking serious action.

See also
Gnome
Knocker
Kobold
Krasnoludek

References

Mining folklore
Mythic humanoids
Slavic legendary creatures